Alonzo Fulgham is an international development strategist and business executive. He served as the former Acting Administrator of the United States Agency for International Development (USAID).

Early life and education 

Alonzo grew up in the Dorchester neighborhood of Boston and graduated from Hyde Park High School in Boston. He was a stand-out varsity athlete and graduated in 1976. After high school he attended Fisk University in Nashville, Tennessee, where he received his Bachelor of Arts in business and economics and in 2001 obtained a Master of Arts from the National Defense University in Washington, DC.

Career 

On January 27, 2009, Fulgham was appointed by President Barack Obama as Acting Administrator of USAID, replacing Henrietta Fore.  Prior to this appointment, from 2006 to 2009 served as Chief Operating Officer of USAID.  Most notably during his tenure at USAID, Fulgham became the first ever African-American Acting Administrator in the agency's history; was the first ever named Chief Operating Officer and was the first African-American to run the largest bilateral program in Afghanistan during the war (2005-2010).

Following his departure from USAID he served as Vice President to International Relief and Development (IRD). IRD is a nonprofit, nongovernmental organization responsible for implementing relief stabilization and development programs worldwide. During his tenure at IRD, Fulgham was responsible for execution and strategic business initiatives that cut across IRD's operations, program development and emerging business services areas.

Fulgham serves as a Director at Palladium International, a global advisory and development firm. He is also a member of the Council on Foreign Relations, an International Advisory Board member of the Carnegie Mellon University Center for International Relations and Politics, and a board member and Vice-Chair of the American Academy of Diplomacy. In September of 2022, he was appointed to the Advisory Committee of the Export Import Bank of the United States (EXIM - exim.gov).

In July 2012, Fulgham was named Senior Vice President for Strategy and Sustainable International Development at CH2M HILL. While there, Fulgham was responsible for advancing the firms business interests in energy, infrastructure, water and environmental development with strategic partners in the Asia-Pacific and African regions. Fulgham served in this capacity until late 2015. He continued to work with the CH2M organization as a consultant for several months thereafter.

In mid-2016, Alonzo Fulgham was named President of the Dutch firm Galileo Energy Partners, BV. Galileo Energy Partners, BV (GEP), is an integrated development and investment company focused on the energy and mining sectors in Africa (See www.galileoenergy.partners). GEP, along with its affiliated companies and joint venture partners, is a trader in crude oil and refined products; a developer of large scale electrical power projects, and an investor in oil, gas, mining and power assets throughout Africa.

After three and a half years with Galileo, Fulgham departed in late 2019 to resume full-time consulting with the private consultancy he founded in 2012, TJM International Consultants (TJM). TJM is a dynamic consultancy offering the unique expertise of an international development, policy, planning and operations executive. TJM consults on global development policy & humanitarian assistance, as well as on leading organizational change for effective results. Through past practice and in this role, Alonzo Fulgham has emerged as a thought leader on diversity and inclusion practices in international relations and global management practice.

In March of 2020, Alonzo Fulgham took on new corporate responsibilities as the Executive Vice President-Defense/Homeland for Viateq Corporation of McLean, VA. Viateq is a certified SBA, SDB, and Minority owned company employing over 80 career professionals in 8 states, and CONUS (United States territory, including the adjacent territorial waters, located within North America between Canada and Mexico) Operations. In this role, Fulgham directs an operation that provides Application Development and Management, Cyber and Information Security Services, Call Center and Help Desk, and Program Management and Business Operations expertise. He is part of leadership team comprises former senior government managers, Business Operation Support SME’s, and doctorate level technical advisors.

Alonzo is the recent recipient of the Thursday Luncheon Groups's "2022 Pioneer Award". The Thursday Luncheon Group, a 501(c)(3) organization, was founded in 1973 to increase the participation of African Americans in the formulation, the articulation, and the implementation of United States foreign policy. Fulgham was also cited and advised on the recently published, "The Young Black Leader's Guide to a Successful Career in International Affairs". (2022, Lynne Reiner Publishers)  

Alonzo Fulgham lives in the Northern Virginia area.

References

External links 

 https://thehill.com/opinion/international/521111-us-policy-must-adjust-to-transnational-issues - Opinion, Alonzo Fulgham, October 18, 2020, thehill.com
 https://generalandambassador.libsyn.com/development-as-a-tool-of-national-security-part-ii-usaid-in-afghanistan-achievements-lessons-learned-and-using-the-right-resources-in-future-challenges - Conversation, Alonzo Fulgham with James Bever, September 19, 2020, The General and the Ambassador Podcast, https://generalandambassador.libsyn.com
 https://www.newamerica.org/political-reform/events/where-does-national-security-community-stand-three-months-after-george-floyd-changed-world/ Webinar Panelist - Alonzo Fulgham, August 25, 2020, Event co-hosted by Diversity in National Security Network and New America's New Models of Policy Change Initiative. https://www.newamerica.org/
 https://thepalladiumgroup.com/news/Global-Development-Needs-Young-People-of-Color - "Global Development Needs Young People of Color", Opinion, Alonzo Fulgham, Palladium - Jan 30 2020
 https://www.linkedin.com/in/alonzo-fulgham-86187635/details/experience/
 https://www.thursdayluncheongroup.org/copy-of-tlg-pioneer-award-recipient
 https://www.rienner.com/title/The_Young_Black_Leader_s_Guide_to_a_Successful_Career_in_International_Affairs

Living people
Fisk University alumni
Administrators of the United States Agency for International Development
Year of birth missing (living people)
Hyde Park High School (Massachusetts) alumni
National Defense University alumni
People from Dorchester, Massachusetts